Buffalo Creek is a stream in the U.S. state of South Dakota.

Buffalo Creek was named for the fact buffalo meat was dried near it.

See also
List of rivers of South Dakota

References

Rivers of Harding County, South Dakota
Rivers of South Dakota